The modified lognormal power-law (MLP)  function is a three parameter function that can be used to model data that have characteristics of a log-normal distribution and a power law behavior. It has been used to model the functional form of the initial mass function (IMF).  Unlike the other functional forms of the IMF, the MLP is a single function with no joining conditions.

Functional form
The closed form of the probability density function of the MLP is as follows:

where  is the asymptotic power-law index of the distribution.

Mathematical properties

Following are the few mathematical properties of the MLP distribution:

Cumulative distribution

The MLP cumulative distribution function is given by:

We can see that as  that  which is the cumulative distribution function for a lognormal distribution with parameters μ0 and σ0.

Mean, variance, raw moments 

This exists if and only if α > , in which case it becomes:

This gives the mean and variance of the MLP distribution:

Var() = ⟨2⟩-(⟨⟩)2 = α exp(σ02 + 2μ0) ( - ), α > 2

Mode 

The solution to the equation  = 0 (equating the slope to zero at the point of maxima) for  gives the mode of the MLP distribution.

where  and 

Numerical methods are required to solve this transcendental equation. However, noting that if ≈1 then u = 0 gives us the mode *:

Random variate 

The lognormal random variate is:

where  is standard normal random variate. The exponential random variate is :

where R(0,1) is the uniform random variate in the interval [0,1]. Using these two, we can derive the random variate for the MLP distribution to be:

References  
 

Normal distribution